Robert P. Stiller is an American billionaire who co-founded E-Z Wider in 1972 and Keurig Green Mountain coffee company in 1981. He graduated from New York Military Academy and Parsons College. In 2001, he was named Forbes's first "Entrepreneur of the Year" and one of Investors Business Daily's "Top 10 leaders and successful CEOs".

References 

Living people
Year of birth missing (living people)
American billionaires
Parsons College alumni
New York Military Academy alumni
American company founders